Peter O'Malley may refer to:

 Peter O'Malley (born 1937) is an American baseball executive.
 Peter O'Malley (cricketer) (1927-1957), New Zealand cricketer
 Peter O'Malley (footballer), New Zealand international football (soccer) player
 Peter O'Malley (golfer) (born 1965), Australian golfer